Isspah Butte is a tuya in the Atsutla Range of the Kawdy Plateau in northern British Columbia, Canada. It lies on the north side of the Nazcha Creek.

See also
 List of volcanoes in Canada
 List of Northern Cordilleran volcanoes
 Volcanism of Canada
 Volcanism of Western Canada

References
 
 "Isspah Butte/Metah Mt." Catalogue of Canadian volcanoes
 

Stikine Plateau
Tuyas of Canada
Volcanoes of British Columbia
One-thousanders of British Columbia
Northern Cordilleran Volcanic Province
Pleistocene volcanoes